Horse Island or Horse Holm and known locally as Da Holm, is one of the Shetland Islands. It lies about 2.3 km west of Sumburgh Head at the south tip of the Mainland, Shetland. In the Norn Language, it was called Hundiholmi (dog island) but later was renamed Horse Holm. It is used as an alignment point by local fishermen for several fishing marks.

Footnotes

This article incorporates text from Shetlopedia

Uninhabited islands of Shetland